Titanium(III) bromide is the inorganic compound with the formula TiBr3.  It is a blue black paramagnetic solid with a reddish reflection.  It has few applications, although it is a catalyst for the polymerization of alkenes.

Production and structure
TiBr3 can be produced by heating the tetrabromide in an atmosphere of hydrogen:
2TiBr4  +  H2   →   2TiBr3  +  2HBr
It can also be produced by comproportionation of titanium metal and titanium tetrabromide.
Ti  +  3TiBr4   →   4TiBr3

Two polymorphs of TiBr3 are known, each exhibiting octahedral Ti centers.

Reactions
Heating the tribromide gives titanium(II) bromide together with the volatile tetrabromide:
2 TiBr3   →    TiBr4  +  TiBr2

The solid dissolves in donor solvents (L) such as pyridine and nitriles to produce 3:1 adducts:
TiBr3  +  3 L   →   TiBr3L3

References 

Bromides
Titanium(III) compounds
Titanium halides